Lomnický štít is one of the highest and most visited mountain peaks in the High Tatras mountains of Slovakia.

Local shoemaker and amateur miner Jakab Fábry stated he made an ascent around 1760–1790, but the first recorded ascent was made by the English traveler Robert Townson and guide on 16 August 1793. He measured the elevation of the peak to be 2633 m, a meter below the actual elevation. The first winter ascent was made in 1891.

In the past, Lomnický štít was called as Vater (Father), Grossvater (Grandfather), Königsberg (King's Mountain), Królowa Tatr and Królowa Tatrzańska (Princess of the Tatra), Petra altissima kesmarkiensis and allerhöchster Kaisermärkerfels (Highest cliff of Kežmarok), höchste Kaisermärker Spitze (Highest peak of Kežmarok), késmárki hegyek (Hills of Kežmarok), Kesmarker Spitze or Lumnitzer Spitze (Peak of Kežmarok or Peak of Lomnica).

Since 1940, tourists have reached the peak by cable car. They are allowed to stay on the peak for 50 minutes. The cable car system is normally closed in the month of May for annual maintenance. It is also possible to climb the peak from Lomnický Saddle, but this is only permitted with a mountain guide.

There is a solar observatory and weather station permanently manned year round at the terminus of the cable car.

Access 
After Gerlachovský štít is Lomnický štít the second most guided peak in High Tatras. The most used is the Classic route also known as Emericyho nárek. The path is popular mostly because of easy access. You can take a lift from Tatranská Lomnica up to Lomnické sedlo (2189 meters above sea level) and from there straight forward to the top. The harder sections of the path are secured by steel steps and chains. 

Another very popular route is called Jordanova cesta. The route begins at Starý Smokovec and within 3 hours and 35 minutes of hiking you will end up at Téryho Chata, where the challenging section begins. The route from here is relatively hard for orientation, the steep sections are however secured by chains.

The route called Medené Lávky starts at chata pri Zelenom plese, we head along an unmarked sidewalk over a kneeling path to the Čierny štít massif. At the waterfall we climb to the right to a pillar secured by chains. After it we will climb the threshold of the Veľká zmrzlá dolina, cross the stream and head left to the Medená kotlina. Through lifeless rubble fields we get to the main gutter, falling from the saddle between Kežmarok peaks. The path is very exposed to stone fall and recently is not as popular.

Gypsyho ferrata just like the classic route Emericyho nárek starts at Lomnické Sedlo, the real starting point is however hard to find. Gypsyho ferrata is secured with chains and steel steps, however full ferrata gear is due to extreme exposure in the upper section necessary.

The route through Cmiter starts at Skalnaté pleso, leading through Skalnatá dolina underneath to the massifs of Vidlové veže and Kežmarský štít. The route is exposed to stone fall. The harder sections require rope, since the path is not secured by any additional gear such as chains.

Climate

Gallery

References

Sources 
 http://www.vysoketatry.com/ciele/lstit/en.html

External links

UNESCO — Natural Reserves of Tatras Mountains
 Tatry.org: Tatry Open Directory
 High Tatra Mountains visualized in 3D
 3D scan of Lomnický peak, one of the highest mountain peaks in the High Tatras mountains. 

Mountains of Slovakia
Mountains of the Western Carpathians
High Tatras